Cedar River National Grassland is a National Grassland located in Sioux County and Grant County in southern North Dakota, United States. The portion in Sioux County lies within the Standing Rock Indian Reservation. Within the grassland are topographic features such as level plains and rolling hills. Dry streams and some small flowing streams exist throughout the Grasslands.

The grassland is administered by the U.S. Forest Service as part of the Dakota Prairie Grasslands from offices in Bismarck, North Dakota. There are local ranger district offices (shared with Grand River National Grassland) in Lemmon, South Dakota.

References

External links

 Dakota Prairie Grasslands - U.S. Forest Service
 List of bird species on the Grand and Cedar River National Grasslands.
 Map showing free dispersed camping opportunities on the Cedar River National Grassland (no developed campground)

National Grasslands of the United States
Protected areas of Grant County, North Dakota
Protected areas of Sioux County, North Dakota
Grasslands of North Dakota